Alexis Chiclana Meléndez (born February 2, 1987) is a Puerto Rican judoka, who played for the middleweight category. He won a bronze medal for his division at the 2010 Central American and Caribbean Games in Mayagüez, Puerto Rico.

Chiclana represented Puerto Rico at the 2008 Summer Olympics in Beijing, where he competed for the men's middleweight class (90 kg). He lost the first preliminary match, with an ippon and an uchi mata (inner thigh throw), to Spain's David Alarza.

References

External links

NBC Olympics Profile

Puerto Rican male judoka
Living people
Olympic judoka of Puerto Rico
Judoka at the 2008 Summer Olympics
1987 births
Central American and Caribbean Games bronze medalists for Puerto Rico
Competitors at the 2010 Central American and Caribbean Games
Central American and Caribbean Games medalists in judo